Mujuru is a surname. Notable people with the surname include:

Bonaparte Mujuru (born 1987), Zimbabwean cricketer 
Joice Mujuru (born 1955), Zimbabwe politician
Solomon Mujuru (1945–2011), Zimbabwe guerrilla
Ephat Mujuru (1950–2001), Zimbabwe musician

Surnames of African origin